Bernhard Landauer (born 20 July 1970) is an Austrian countertenor in opera and concert, who is active internationally in both historically informed performance and contemporary music.

Life and career 
Bernhard Landauer was born in Innsbruck. He was a soprano soloist with the Wilten Boys' Choir in his hometown, and then studied voice at the University of Music and Performing Arts, Vienna, with Helene Karusso and Kurt Equiluz. He studied further with Karl-Heinz Jarius in Frankfurt.

Landauer took part in the project of Ton Koopman and the Amsterdam Baroque Orchestra & Choir to record the complete vocal works of J. S. Bach. He performed two roles in Der verlorene Sohn by Leopold I of Austria at the Vienna State Opera in 1997. In 2000, he performed the role of Mercury in the first modern revival of Giovanni Legrenzi's La divisione del mondo at the Schwetzingen Festival.

Besides Early music and Baroque music, he performed literature that unusual for a countertenor. He has performed song cycles such as Schubert's Winterreise and Krämerspiegel by Richard Strauss. He appeared as Fyodor in Mussorgsky's Boris Godunov, and in Kassandra by Iannis Xenakis, originally written for falsetting baritone. He performed in world premieres of compositions by Alfred Schnittke and Giorgio Battistelli, among others. He performed in the world premiere of Schnittke's Gesualdo at the Vienna State Opera in 1995.

Landauer has performed on many stages worldwide with renowned orchestras, conductors and stage directors such as Philippe Arlaud, Brigitte Fassbaender, Achim Freyer, Thomas Hengelbrock, René Jacobs, The King's Consort, Harry Kupfer, David Pountney, Nicola Raab or Mstislav Rostropovich. He has recorded more than 70 CDs and has been well received by critics.

From 1998 to 2004, Bernhard Landauer taught at the department of early music at the Conservatory of Vienna, and since 2005 has been lecturer at the Austrian Master Classes. He has lived in Salzburg.

References

External links 
 
 
 
 Bernhard Landauer (Counter-tenor) Bach Cantatas Website 2001

1970 births
Living people
University of Music and Performing Arts Vienna alumni
20th-century Austrian male opera singers
21st-century Austrian male opera singers
Operatic countertenors
Musicians from Innsbruck